Princess Pei (裴王后, personal name unknown) (died 354) was the wife of the Chinese state Former Liang's ruler Zhang Chonghua.  Very little is known about her, including when Zhang Chonghua made her his princess.  After Zhang Chonghua's death in 353, Zhang Chonghua's brother Zhang Zuo served as regent, and in early 354, he formally took over the role of ruler, with the approval of the mother of Zhang Chonghua, Princess Dowager Ma (who was said to have had an affair with him).  He then, for reasons unknown, executed Princess Pei.

Former Liang princesses
354 deaths
Year of birth unknown